Parliamentary elections were held in Hungary on 8 June 1980. The Hungarian Socialist Workers' Party was the only party to contest the elections, and won 252 of the 352 seats, with the remaining 100 going to independents selected by the party. 

All prospective candidates had to accept the program of the Patriotic People's Front, which was dominated by the HSWP. While it was possible for more than one candidate to run in a constituency, only 15 of the 352 constituencies had more than one candidate.

Results

References

Elections in Hungary
Parliametary
Hungary
One-party elections
Hungary

hu:Országgyűlési választások a Magyar Népköztársaságban#1980